The 1997 Icelandic Men's Football League Cup was the second staging of the Icelandic League Cup. It featured 34 teams. The competition started on 13 March 1997  and concluded on 13 May 1997 with ÍBV beating Valur 3-2 in the final.

Details
 The 34 teams were divided into 5 groups of 6 teams and 1 group of 4 teams, with the top two teams from each group qualifying for the second group stage. The second group stage consisted of 4 groups each of 3 teams. The teams played each other once with the top team in each group going through to the semi finals.

Group stage

Group A

Group B

Group C

Group D

Group E

Group F

Second round

Group A

Group B

Group C

Group D

Semi-finals

Final

See also
Icelandic Men's Football Cup
Knattspyrnusamband Íslands - The Icelandic Football Association
Icelandic First Division League 1997

References
RSSSF Page - Deildabikar 1997

1997 domestic association football cups
1997 in Icelandic football
Icelandic Men's Football League Cup